Mauree A. Gingrich (born July 10, 1946) is an American politician who served as a Republican member of the Pennsylvania House of Representatives for the 101st District and was elected in 2002. She served on the House Aging and Older Adult Services, Appropriations, Health and Human Services, and Local Government Committees.

Personal
Gingrich lives in Hershey with her husband. She has four children and seven grandchildren.

References

External links

Representative Gingrich's official web site
Pennsylvania House profile

1946 births
Living people
Republican Party members of the Pennsylvania House of Representatives
People from Lebanon County, Pennsylvania
Politicians from Baltimore
Women state legislators in Pennsylvania
21st-century American politicians
21st-century American women politicians